Song Soo-joo (born 24 September 1991) is a South Korean sport shooter.

She participated at the 2018 ISSF World Shooting Championships.

References

External links

Living people
1991 births
South Korean male sport shooters
ISSF rifle shooters
Shooters at the 2018 Asian Games
Asian Games competitors for South Korea